The Wakarusa River is a tributary of the Kansas River, approximately  long, in eastern Kansas in the United States. It drains an agricultural area of rolling limestone hills south of Topeka and Lawrence.

Description
It rises in several branches located southwest of Topeka.

The main branch flows generally east, flowing south of Lawrence.

The river is known for its gentle current that winds through river-level outcropping rocks, primarily of Pennsylvanian limestone.  This reach of the river was inhabited by different Native American tribes, including the Kansa and Osage Nation in the 18th century.

During 1819-1820, Major Stephen H. Long referred to this tributary as "Warreruza". According to a 1912 encyclopedia, the name comes from an Indian legend, wherein a young woman was crossing the river on horseback. She exclaimed "Wakarusa!", meaning "hip deep", and the name stuck. The meanings "thigh deep" and "river of thick weeds" are also recorded.

After the U.S. acquired this region, the Shawnee people were relocated here during the early 19th century. Ridgelines of this historic watershed defined wagon train routes first used by Santa Fe Trail pioneers and Oregon Trail emigrants.

During the Great Migration of 1843, the fords used for crossing this meandering river were among the many topographic challenges emigrant wagon trains had to master along the Fremont-Westport Trail (1843-1848) named after John C. Frémont. This Freedom's Frontier route also was called the California Road during the 1849 gold rush.

Also, during the days of the Kansas Territory, the limestone outcroppings of the river presented great challenges to early white emigrants attempting to ford the stream in their wagons. Oregon Trail wagons were often dismantled, lowered down the limestone beds, towed across, then lifted by rope to the opposing bank.

Several Shawnee created ferry operations at river crossings in the 1850s, including Blue Jacket's Ferry near Coal Creek at Sebastian. The river's gentle current and scenic banks made it an early recreation spot for citizens of Lawrence (which was originally called "Wacharusa"). See Indian Territory (1820-1840)

The river once had extensive wetland riparian habitat, much of which has been reclaimed over the last century for cultivation and other uses. Clinton Dam, finished in 1977 to reduce seasonal spring flooding, greatly reduced the replenishment of wetlands below the dam.

Though the wetlands below the dam are mostly dry now, along the Wakarusa above Clinton Lake, former cropland has been converted into a new wetland area. The East and West Coblentz complexes are more accessible than the Elk Creek complex, and boast a large variety of waterfowl and reptiles. Due to the wetlands lying within the low Clinton Lake floodpool, access is very limited during the wet spring months.

Tributaries and other landmarks
(This list follows Wakarusa River flow downstream)
 Middle Branch Wakarusa
 South Branch Wakarusa
 North Branch Wakarusa
 Six Mile Creek
 Towhead Creek
 Bury's Creek
 Lynn Creek
 Camp Creek
 Elk-Horn Creek
 Dry Creek
 Deer Creek
 Coon Creek
 Clinton Lake - Elev: 
 South Rock Creek
 Washington Creek
 Yankee Tank Creek
 USGS Gaging Station - Elev: 
 Black Jack Creek (COAL CREEK), trib. of Wakarusa River; Douglas Co. USGS: Lawrence E. 
 Spring Creek
 Little Wakarusa Creek

Cities along the Wakarusa River
 Auburn, Kansas - Elev: 
 Wakarusa, Kansas (unincorporated) - Elev: 
 Richland, Kansas (unincorporated) - Elev: 
 Eudora - Elev:

See also
 Bleeding Kansas Heritage Area
 California Road - Branch of the Oregon Trail to Lawrence, Kansas from Westport Landing.
 Clinton State Park - Provides recreational access to Clinton Lake.
 Wakarusa War
 List of Kansas rivers
 Lakes, reservoirs, and dams in Kansas

References

External links

Human geography 
 Bluejacket Crossing
 Old West Kansas Historic Trails
 Part I of James's Account of S. H. Long's Expedition, 1819--1820 (p. 184)

Physical geography 
 Fresh water supplies: Out of the tap (series)
 Upper Wakarusa Watershed
 Lower Kaw Valley Watershed Profile
 KWO: Kansas-Lower Republican Basin
 Emporia State University: Wakarusa Land Cover

Rivers of Douglas County, Kansas
Rivers of Shawnee County, Kansas
Rivers of Kansas
Tributaries of the Kansas River